René van der Kuil (born 3 June 1956) is a former freestyle swimmer from the Netherlands. He competed at the 1976 Summer Olympics in the 200 m, 400 m and 4 × 200 m freestyle relay events and finished in sixth place in the relay.

References

1958 births
Living people
Dutch male freestyle swimmers
Swimmers at the 1976 Summer Olympics
Olympic swimmers of the Netherlands
Sportspeople from Schiedam
20th-century Dutch people
21st-century Dutch people